Carlos Alberto Tomasi (1 March 1930 – 13 August 2017) was an Argentine bobsledder who competed from the early 1950s to the mid-1960s. Competing in two Winter Olympics, he achieved his best finish of eighth in the four-man bobsleigh event at the 1952 Oslo games. Twelve years later he finished 16th in the four-man event at the 1964 Winter Olympics.

References

External links
 
 1952 bobsleigh four-man results
 1964 bobsleigh four-man results

1930 births
2017 deaths
Argentine male bobsledders
Olympic bobsledders of Argentina
Bobsledders at the 1952 Winter Olympics
Bobsledders at the 1964 Winter Olympics